Paul Anthony Skansi (born January 11, 1961) is an American football scout for the Washington Commanders of the National Football League (NFL). A former wide receiver, he played college football for the Washington Huskies and was drafted by the Pittsburgh Steelers in the fifth round of the 1983 NFL Draft. Skansi played the majority of his NFL career with the Seattle Seahawks before playing a final season with the Ottawa Rough Riders in 1992. He served as an assistant college football coach in the 1990s before becoming a scout with the San Diego Chargers in 2000, where he worked until 2015.

Early life 
Born in Tacoma, Washington, Skansi attended Peninsula High School in Gig Harbor. After watching him play in a high school basketball game, coach Don James of the UW Huskies offered him a football scholarship.

Playing career 
He was a leading receiver for the Washington Huskies football team, setting the Husky record for passes received during his four years of play from 1979 to 1982. 

Skansi was selected in the fifth round of the 1983 NFL Draft by the Pittsburgh Steelers, playing there for one season before joining the Seattle Seahawks the following year. His most successful season was 1989, when he caught 39 passes for 488 yards and five touchdowns. Over his career, he caught 166 passes for 1,950 yards and ten touchdowns. He caught the tying 25-yard touchdown pass from quarterback Dave Krieg in the final second of a 1990 game against the Kansas City Chiefs at Arrowhead Stadium.

Coaching and scouting 
Skansi was an assistant coach for the Idaho Vandals and Nevada Wolf Pack throughout most of the 1990s. He then worked as a scout for the San Diego Chargers from 2000 to 2015 before joining the Washington Redskins in 2017.

References

External links
Washington Commanders profile
Sports Reference – college statistics

1961 births
Living people
American football wide receivers
Washington Huskies football players
Washington Commanders scouts
Washington Redskins scouts
Washington Football Team scouts
San Diego Chargers scouts
Pittsburgh Steelers players
Seattle Seahawks players
Idaho Vandals football coaches
Nevada Wolf Pack football coaches
Players of American football from Tacoma, Washington